Hollywood Town Hall is the third studio album by American rock band The Jayhawks. It peaked at number 11 on the Billboard Heatseekers chart and number 192 on the Billboard 200. The cover art for the album was shot in Hollywood Township, Carver County, Minnesota by British photographer Andrew Catlin.

Reception

David Browne of Entertainment Weekly wrote that despite noticeable musical influences from The Everly Brothers, The Rolling Stones, and Neil Young on the album, "there's nothing nostalgic about the passion and desperation in every syllable of singer-songwriter Mark Olson's voice — or in the band's effortless mix of sawdust harmonies and craggy electric guitars." Steve Hochman of the Los Angeles Times stated that Olson and Gary Louris "achieve a yearning ache that would have done top Burrito Gram Parsons proud". Rolling Stones Chris Mundy hailed Hollywood Town Hall as the band's "definitive statement" and praised Olson and Louris' vocal harmonies. Music critic Robert Christgau was less positive and gave the album a "neither" rating, indicating an album that "may impress once or twice with consistent craft or an arresting track or two. Then it won't."

In a retrospective review for AllMusic, critic Ned Raggett called Hollywood Town Hall "one of the more unlikely major label releases of 1992" and described the album as "accessible enough for should-have-been success but bowing to no trends", concluding that it "sounds more like something made for the group's own satisfaction that connects beyond it as well." Stephen M. Deusner of Pitchfork cited the album as "the Jayhawks' greatest statement."

Track listing
All songs written by Mark Olson and Gary Louris except "Wichita" by Olson, Louris and Marc Perlman.
"Waiting for the Sun" – 4:19
"Crowded in the Wings" – 4:55
"Clouds" – 4:51
"Two Angels" – 4:04
"Take Me with You (When You Go)" – 4:50
"Sister Cry" – 4:08
"Settled Down Like Rain" – 3:00
"Wichita" – 5:26
"Nevada, California" – 4:05
"Martin's Song" – 2:58

European CD bonus track
"Leave No Gold" – 5:46

2011 expanded reissue track listing
"Leave No Gold" – 5:48 (previously commercially unavailable in the U.S.)
"Keith and Quentin" – 2:37 (previously commercially unavailable in the U.S.)
"Up Above My Head" – 2:36 (previously commercially unavailable in the U.S.)
"Warm River" – 3:23 (previously unreleased)
"Mother Trust You to Walk to the Store" – 3:53 (previously unreleased)

Personnel
The Jayhawks
 Mark Olson – acoustic guitar, electric guitar, harmonica, vocals
 Marc Perlman – bass
 Ken Callahan – drums 
 Gary Louris – electric guitar, fuzz guitar, guitar, vocals

Additional musicians
 Charlie Drayton – drums
 Nicky Hopkins – piano on "Two Angels" and "Martin's Song"
 Benmont Tench – piano, organ

Production
 George Drakoulias – producer
 Howie Weinberg – mastering
 Tom Herbers – engineer
 Brian Jenkins – engineer
 Brendan O'Brien – engineer
 Jim Rondinelli – engineer
 Dale Lavi – photographer
 Joe Henry – liner notes
 Martyn Atkins – art direction

References

External links
Jayhawks fan site discography.

1992 albums
The Jayhawks albums
Albums produced by George Drakoulias